Roanne Ho (born 27 October 1992) is a retired Singaporean swimmer. In 2018, she won the silver medal in the women's 50 metre breaststroke event at the 2018 Asian Games held in Jakarta, Indonesia. She also competed in the women's 100 metre breaststroke event.

In 2018, she also competed in the women's 50 metre breaststroke and women's 100 metre breaststroke events at the 2018 Commonwealth Games held in Gold Coast, Australia.

She announced her retirement from competitive swimming in February 2019.

References 

Living people
1992 births
People from Singapore
Singaporean female breaststroke swimmers
Swimmers at the 2006 Asian Games
Swimmers at the 2014 Asian Games
Swimmers at the 2018 Asian Games
Medalists at the 2018 Asian Games
Asian Games silver medalists for Singapore
Asian Games medalists in swimming
Commonwealth Games competitors for Singapore
Swimmers at the 2018 Commonwealth Games
20th-century Singaporean women
21st-century Singaporean women